Sultanipura is a village in the Taluk and District of Davangere, Karnataka in India. It is located 20 kilometers from Davangere. It is one of the smallest village in davangere, having around 50-60 families in total.

Demographics
As of 2011 it has population of about 300–350.

History
It is popular in the Mayakonda hobli for having a fort inside village which was believed to be constructed 300–400 years ago and the fort got destroyed in recent years due to improper maintenance and heavy rainy season.

The village is also famous for most of its native residents being migrated to semi-urban areas like Davangere, Chitradurga, Bangalore and near by towns. It is believed that more than 50% of existing population is migrated till date. The village is also famous for agricultural activities.

Villages in Davanagere district